Jaclyn Hill is a mountain located in the Catskill Mountains of New York north of Hobart. Mount Bob is located south of Jaclyn Hill and Peters Hill is located north.

References

Mountains of Delaware County, New York
Mountains of New York (state)